Yolanda Arrieta Malaxetxeberria (Etxebarria, Biscay, 6 July 1963) is a Basque writer. She completed her teaching studies in the school of teachers of Ezkoriatza, in the speciality of Basque Philosophy. After that, she studied theater at the Antzerti school and finally, she studied Cultural and Social Anthropology, at the Faculty of Philosophy and Educational Sciences of San Sebastián. Her greatest activity has always been literature, mainly as a creative writer and also conducting literary workshops and fostering a taste for Literature and Reading.

It is worth noting their sessions with parents and teachers launching an effort to bring literature and oral tradition closer.

She has written books both for children and adults.

Besides her literature work, she has worked for EITB as a scriptwriter and lately she has worked as a guest signer in different basque newspapers (Berria and Deia) and magazines (Argia).

The main theme of her work is based on the fact that there are no small stories and also on the importance of women in the oral transmission of literature.

Works 
Her writing list is long. She has published more than fifiteen books. These are some of the last published ones:

Novels 
 Agur, ama! (2009, Aizkorri)
 Ongi etorri! (2009, Galdakaoko Town Hall)
 Itzalpetik (2010, Erein)
 Nitaz ahaztu dira (2010, Erein)
 Amaren urteak (2011, Aizkorri)
 Iturretako ermita (2011, Markina-XemeinTown Hall)
 ABCD berri bat (2011, Mezulari)
 Ai, ai, ai! (2011, Mezulari)
 Basajaun eta Martin (2012, Erein)
 Maddalenen usaina (2014, Ibaizabal)
 Argiaren alaba (2015, Denonartean) Euskadi Saria Award Winner
 Kulun kuttunak (2016, Denonartean)
 Aho bete amets: ahozko haur poesiaren alde (2016, Denonartean)
 Luna-cuna (2017, Elkar)

Awards 
 1990: I Legazpi Award, Theater mode.
 1991: Baporea Award
 1991: Euskadi Theater Award
 1991: Santurtziko Short Theater Award
 1991: Pedro Barrutia Theater Award
 1993: Donostia City Theater Award, Second Prize
 1997: Irun City Award
 2006: Max Award
 2011: Peru Abarka Award
 2015: Euskadi Literature Award

References 
 ↑ «Yolanda Arrieta Malaxetxebarria» Galtzagorri Association's website.
 ↑ Reading Club of Bizkaia
 ↑ a b Basque Literature website
 ↑ Basque Writer's Association

External links 
 Yolanda Arrieta's website
 «Yolanda Arrieta», Basque Literature Dictionary
 «Yolanda Arrieta», "Literaturaren Zubitegia" website (the writer and his work)
 «Yolanda Arrieta», Basqueliterature.com

1963 births
Basque writers
Living people
Basque-language writers
20th-century Spanish writers
21st-century Spanish writers